{{Infobox military installation
| name = RAF Henlow
| ensign=Ensign of the Royal Air Force.svg
| ensign_size=90px
| native_name =
| partof =
| location = Henlow, Bedfordshire
| nearest_town =
| country = England
| image =Henlow Airfield - geograph.org.uk - 4549988.jpg
| caption =RAF Henlow from above
| image2 = RAF Henlow badge.jpg
| caption2 = 
| pushpin_map = Bedfordshire
| pushpin_label = RAF Henlow
| pushpin_map_caption = Shown within Bedfordshire
| pushpin_label_position = left
| coordinates = 
| type = RAF training station
| code =
| site_area =
| height =
| ownership = Ministry of Defence
| operator = Royal Air Force
| controlledby = No. 2 Group
| open_to_public =
| condition =
| built = 
| builder = McAlpine (1918) various since
| used = 1918–Present
| materials =
| fate =
| battles =
| events =
| current_commander = Wing Commander Chris Brooke
| past_commanders = 
| garrison =
| occupants =
 RAF Centre of Aviation Medicine
 Defence Cultural Specialist Unit
 Joint Arms Control Implementation Group
 Information Systems Support – Engineering Operations
 Defence Equipment & Support
| elevation =
| IATA =
| ICAO = EGWE
| FAA =
| TC =
| LID =
| GPS =
| WMO =
| r1-number =02/20
| r1-length =
| r1-surface =Grass
| r2-number =13/31
| r2-length =
| r2-surface =Grass
| r3-number =08R/26L
| r3-length =
| r3-surface =Grass
| r4-number =08L/26R
| r4-length =
| r4-surface =Grass
| website = 
| footnotes = ''Source: RAF Henlow Defence Aerodrome Manual
}}RAF Henlow is a Royal Air Force station in Bedfordshire, England, equidistant from Bedford, Luton and Stevenage. It houses the RAF Centre of Aviation Medicine, the Joint Arms Control Implementation Group (JACIG), elements of Defence Equipment and Support, and the Signals Museum. It formerly hosted light aircraft flying and 616 Volunteer Gliding Squadron. The Ministry of Defence announced on 6 September 2016 that the base is set to be closed following a consultation.

History
Henlow was chosen as a military aircraft repair depot in 1917 and was built by MacAlpine during 1918. Four Belfast Hangars were built and are now listed buildings.  Henlow Camp, a civilian settlement, grew up around the base at that time.

Originally a repair depot for aircraft from the Western Front, the Station officially opened on 18 May 1918 when Lt Col Robert Francis Stapleton-Cotton arrived with a party of 40 airmen from Farnborough. In May 1920, RAF Henlow became the first parachute testing centre and was later joined by another parachute unit from RAF Northolt. Parachute testing was undertaken with Vimy aircraft and parachutists hanging off the wings and allowing the chute to deploy and enable them to drift back to the ground. The Officers Engineering School moved there in 1924 from Farnborough.

After the First World War, Henlow was home to four aircraft squadrons; No. 19 Squadron RAF, No. 23 Squadron RAF, No. 43 Squadron RAF and No. 80 Squadron RAF. Between 1932 and 1933, Sir Frank Whittle was a student at the RAF technical College on the base. He later spent some time in charge of aero engine testing on the base before being sent to Cambridge. An additional hangar was added to the inventory in the 1930s and this too is now listed.

During the Second World War Henlow was used to assemble the Hawker Hurricanes which had been built at the Hurricane factory operated by Canadian Car and Foundry in Fort William, Ontario, Canada, under the leadership of Elsie MacGill. After test flying in Fort William, they were disassembled and sent to Henlow in shipping containers and reassembled. During Operation Quickforce in 1941, 100 fitters from the base were deployed onto carriers which were shipping Hurricane fighters to Malta. The finished Hurricanes were completed on the decks of the carriers and flown out to Malta. Over 1,000 Hurricanes (about 10% of the total) were built by Canadian Car and Foundry and shipped to Henlow. Henlow was also used as a repair base for many aircraft types under the direction of No. 13 Maintenance Unit.

The empty packing crates that the Hurricane aircraft were shipped in were used to make the original control tower (which has now been replaced by a more modern two-storey Portakabin type). The original tower and parts of the airfield were seen in several scenes in the 1969 war film 'The Battle of Britain'.

A major RAF technical training college was also formed at Henlow in 1947. This was formed from the RAF School of Aeronautical Engineering, formerly at RAF Farnborough, and its purpose was to train cadets and engineering officers. The college was amalgamated with RAF College Cranwell in 1965. The RAF Officer Cadet Training Unit then moved in, but this also moved to Cranwell in 1980.

Henlow then hosted the RAF Signals Engineering Establishment and the Radio Engineering Unit, established in 1980. In 1983, the Land Registry took over part of the site.

In December 2011, RAF Henlow along with 14 other Ministry of Defence sites in the United Kingdom were designated as being dangerously radioactive. The 15 bases were believed to be poisoned as a consequence of undetermined activity during the Second World War.

Administratively, RAF Henlow was part of a combined base, RAF Brampton Wyton Henlow, until RAF Brampton was closed in 2013.

On 6 September 2016, UK Defence Secretary Michael Fallon announced the planned closure of RAF Henlow along with 12 other military sites owned by the MoD. The land will be used for housing to help meet the government's target of 160,000 homes by 2020. The closure date was later extended to 2023, and once more to 2026.

Based units
Notable units based at RAF Henlow in 2017/18.

 British Army Intelligence Corps (1st Intelligence, Surveillance and Reconnaissance Brigade) Defence Cultural Specialist Unit

 Royal Air Force No. 2 Group (Air Combat Support) RAF Royal Air Force Police
Defence Flying Complaints Investigation Team (DFCIT)
Digital Forensic Flight
Professional Standards Department Headquarters
Provost Marshal's Dog Unit (PMDU)
 Provost Marshal's Dog Inspectorate (PMDI)No. 38 Group (Air Combat Service Support) RAF RAF Medical Operations
RAF Centre of Aviation Medicine
 Centre of Aviation Medicine Headquarters 
 Aviation Medicine Wing
 Occupational and Environmental Medicine Wing
 Support WingOtherSignals Museum

Strategic Command

Joint Arms Control Implementation Group (JACIG)Defence Digital'''
 Engineering Operations
 Communication and Information Systems Branch
 Operations Support Branch

Defence Equipment & Support (DE&S) 
 Air Defence and Electronic Warfare Systems Delivery Team (ADEWS DT)
Supply Chain Information Systems Delivery Team (SCIS DT)
A small detachment of Marshall Delivery Team (Marshall DT)

Former units
The following units were here at some point:

The Signals Museum
The Signals Museum, focused on the development of electronic communications by the RAF since the First World War, was established in 1999.

See also 

 List of Royal Air Force stations

References

Bibliography

External links
 
 RAF Signals Museum
 UK Military Aeronautical Information Publication – Henlow (EGWE)

Royal Air Force stations in Bedfordshire
616 VGS
Museums in Bedfordshire
Military and war museums in England
Technology museums in the United Kingdom
Telecommunications museums in the United Kingdom
RAF